Elizabeth or Bess Pierrepont (1568–1648) was a gentlewoman in household of Mary, Queen of Scots. Mary hoped that she could be trained to join the household of Queen Elizabeth, and prevented her marrying as her father wished.

She was a daughter of Henry Pierrepont and Frances Cavendish. Her parents' home was Holme Pierrepont Hall near Nottingham. She was a granddaughter of Bess of Hardwick.

Elizabeth Pierrepont joined the household of Mary, Queen of Scots in England at a young age. When Mary, Queen of Scots was at Worksop Manor in September 1583, she wrote a letter to "Bess Pierpont", who was at home with her family. Mary thanked her for a letter and a gift, and was going to give her a black gown with a "garniture" of jewellery or trimming for her to wear, ordered from London.

Mary's keeper Ralph Sadler described her father as a "peevish Papist" to Francis Walsingham. Her father in April 1585 had written inviting her to come to visit them at Woodhouse, relatively close to Tutbury Castle, before they moved further away. He had expected her to come straight away and sent his servant with a bag for her night things. Sadler did not like this at all. He told Henry Pierrepont's servant that they should have written to him first, and it was a shame that the young maiden was "nourished and brought up here in Popery".

Pierrepont seems to have had a relationship with Mary's French secretary Claude Nau, and in April 1586 he sent a friend to discuss marriage with her father. Mary was in favour of her marriage now she was 17 and thought married life would improve her figure, that keeping her in the household unmarried might incur the disapproval of Bess of Hardwick, and her marriage would help "bring forward" her younger sister Grace Pierrepont. The marriage did not take place. Nau's English servant had been a member of Henry Pierrepont's household.

Her father asked permission from Queen Elizabeth for her to leave Mary's service in June 1586, with a view to having her married. Mary was reluctant for her to leave. Henry Pierrepont sent horses to fetch her from Chartley Castle, but Mary would not let her go, despite the arguments of her keeper Amias Paulet. A French description of Mary's households note that Elizabeth Pierrepont was in special favour with Mary, eating at her table and sleeping in her bed.

In July Mary wrote that she had no particular plans for Pierrepont's marriage. She had brought her up in her household from the age of four, and had hoped that she would become a servant of Queen Elizabeth. Now however, Mary wanted her go as she reminded her too much of Bess of Hardwick, and thought she would make a bad husband for any friend of hers.

In August 1586 Amias Paulet considered dismissing Pierrepont's maid and placed her in Mr Chetwynd's house at Ingestre.

She is sometimes said to be the "Elizabeth Pierrepont" who married Sir Thomas Erskine in 1604.

She is identified as the wife of Richard Stapleton of Carlton and the mother of the courtier and poet Robert Stapylton. She died in 1648.

References

External links 
 British Library, Vespasian FIII f82, Letter from Mary to Elizabeth Pierrepont

Court of Mary, Queen of Scots
1569 births
1648 deaths